Arnold Snow Naudain (January 6, 1790 – January 4, 1872) was an American physician and politician from Odessa in New Castle County, Delaware. He was a veteran of the War of 1812, and a member of the Whig Party, who served in the Delaware General Assembly and as U.S. Senator from Delaware.

Early life and family
Naudain was born at Snowland or Naudain's Landing, near Leipsic, Kent County, Delaware. He graduated from the College of New Jersey, now Princeton University, in 1806. He then studied medicine at the University of Pennsylvania, graduated in 1810, and began practicing medicine in the Dover area. During the War of 1812 he served as surgeon general of the Delaware Militia.

His brother, Elias Naudain, was justice of the peace in Leipsic, in Little Creek Hundred during the 1820s. He served in the lower house of the Delaware General Assembly in 1827 and in that same year was commissioned first major of the Fourth Regiment of the Delaware Militia. In 1832 he was elected a delegate to the convention to revise the Delaware Constitution and was later was elected to the Delaware Senate.

They were sons of Andrew Naudain and Rebecca Snow. Their father farmed and operated a store at Naudain's Landing. Rebecca Snow was from near Leipsic, Delaware, and her ancestors came to Delaware in 1635. She inherited the  near Leipsic that became known as Snowland or Naudain's Landing, and she and Andrew lived there and are buried there.

Naudain's grandparents were Arnold Naudain and Catharine Allfree. The older Arnold owned a large amount of land, was a member of the legislature in 1763, and was said to have been "a man of very large stature." Naudain's great grandparents were Elias Naudain and Lydia LeRoux. They married in Philadelphia in 1715. He was a mariner, in Delaware by 1717, and described himself as a resident of Appoquinimink Hundred and sometimes as of St. Georges Hundred. In 1735 he acquired farmland known as the "old Naudain homestead," which was located near Taylor's Bridge in Appoquinimink Hundred, and which, except for the period 1816-1827, remained in his descendants' hands into the 20th Century.

Elias was the son of another Elias Naudain and Jahel Arnaud. They were both native to La Tremblade, Santonge, France and were naturalized in London in 1682. Jahel Arnaud came to America with her four children about 1686, probably within a year after the death of her first husband, and was one of the first colonists of Narragansett. She married Jacob Ratier there and moved to New York City when the Narragansett Colony disbanded in 1691. She is believed to have lived with her son, Elias, in Delaware after Jacob died in late 1702 and to have died there in 1720 or 1721.

Arnold Naudain, the subject of this article, married Mary M. Schee in 1810. She was the daughter of Hermanus Schee and Mary Naudain. According to Ruth Bennett in the Naudain Family of Delaware, Mary Schee Naudain is described as "an accomplished and religious woman, a devoted and loving wife and mother. She died in 1860.

Their eight children included James S. Naudain M.D. who married Ann Elizabeth Blackiston, both dying young, Andrew S. Naudain who studied law in the office of John M. Clayton but diverted his efforts to managing the Mt. Airy Plantation while his father served in the U.S. Senate and then went into the leather business in Philadelphia, Rebecca A. Naudain who married Hugh Alexander and lived in Chicago, and Mary H. Naudain who married William N. Hamilton M.D, who had attended school in Dublin, London and Jefferson College in Philadelphia. Practicing medicine first in New Castle, Delaware, in 1839 he moved his practice to Odessa. In the early 1850s he was resident physician at Fort Delaware, was a sergeant in the First Delaware Regiment and in the Fifth Delaware Cavalry. He was also Delaware state auditor and a Republican. Other children were Elizabeth R. Naudain who married James E. Ellis M.D. from West Chester, New York, and Catherine L. Naudain who married a prominent printer of Harrisburg, Adam B. Hamilton, and Lydia Frazier Naudain who married Clayton A. Cowgill M.D., a surgeon in the Civil War, who in 1867 moved to Florida, where he bought a plantation on the St. John River at Orange Mills. He served as Florida state comptroller after Lydia died.

Professional and political career
Naudain established a practice at Cantwell's Bridge, now Odessa, before age 21 and gave medical service in the War of 1812 as surgeon of the Delaware Regiment. While carrying out his medical practice, Naudain was elected to the State House and served there in the 1817 and 1818 sessions and again in the 1826 session, when served with his brother, Elias Naudain from Kent County. Arnold was elected Speaker. He ran unsuccessfully for Congress in 1822, 1824 and 1828, losing each time to Louis McLean. In 1828 he was appointed Judge of the Court of Common Pleas.  He lost again running for Governor of Delaware in 1832 against Democrat Caleb P. Bennett.

Filling the vacancy left by the resignation of Louis McLane, he was elected by the Delaware General Assembly on January 7, 1830, to the United States Senate and served from his election until he resigned on June 16, 1836. During the 24th Congress he was the Chairman of the Committee on Claims. Naudain was an anti-Jacksonian when first elected, and became associated with the Whigs as that party formed.

Naudain served as a member of the board of trustees at Newark College, later the University of Delaware, from 1833 to 1835.  An active Presbyterian layman, Naudain proposed that the University decline the proceeds of a state lottery due to the opposition of his church.  As a result, the state threatened to ask the college to return proceeds purchased from the college's endowment, since they had been financed by an earlier lottery.  However the board of trustees voted 13-0 against rejecting the lottery proceeds. Naudain was one of seven trustees who refused to vote and subsequently resigned his position on the board.

Feeling his private business suffering, Naudain resigned from the U.S. Senate and resumed the practice of medicine in Wilmington. From 1841 until 1845 he was appointed to the position of Collector of the port and superintendent of Light Houses on the Delaware River. That year he moved to Philadelphia and continued his medical practice there, returning to Delaware in 1857. He was a Freemason, serving at one time as Grand Master of the Grand Lodge of Delaware.

Death and legacy
Naudain died on January 4, 1872, two days shy of his 82nd birthday. He is buried in the Old Drawyer's Presbyterian Churchyard at Odessa, Delaware. He was described as "a most courteous gentleman, commanding in person, handsome in feature, and neat in attire; and evenly balanced in temperament; an humble, sincere Christian, a delightful companion, as winsome and interesting in old age as in the hey-day of youth." He has a street in Philadelphia named after him.

Almanac
Elections were held the first Tuesday of October. Members of the General Assembly took office on the first Tuesday of January. State Representatives had a one-year term. The General Assembly chose the U.S. Senators, who took office March 4 for a six-year term. In this case he was initially completing the existing term, the vacancy caused by the resignation of Louis McLane. However, the General Assembly failed to fill the position for nearly a year.

References

External links

Biographical Directory of the United States Congress
Delaware's Members of Congress

Naudain ancestry
Pennsylvania genealogies
The Political Graveyard
Sharp History of Delaware 1609-1888

1790 births
1872 deaths
People from Kent County, Delaware
American people of French descent
Presbyterians from Delaware
National Republican Party United States senators from Delaware
Delaware Whigs
Members of the Delaware House of Representatives
Speakers of the Delaware House of Representatives
Burials in New Castle County, Delaware
People from Odessa, Delaware
Physicians from Delaware
Princeton University alumni
Perelman School of Medicine at the University of Pennsylvania alumni
American militiamen in the War of 1812